The Smith-Duncan House and Eastman Barn are two historic buildings located on the Duncan Farmstead at Pere Marquette State Park in Jersey County, Illinois. The Smith-Duncan House is a two-story limestone house built circa 1861. The house has a double-pile plan, in which each story is two rooms deep, with a central hall. The Eastman Barn has three interior sections and is built on a raised limestone foundation; this arrangement allowed for threshing and storage to be done in the barn and provided a basement space for livestock. A gabled cupola on the barn's roof allows for air to vent from the structure. Both buildings, as well as two contributing retaining walls on the property, are well-preserved examples of local stonework; limestone was a common building material in the Grafton area during the mid-19th century.

The buildings were added to the National Register of Historic Places on November 22, 1999.

See also
Duncan Farm (Grafton, Illinois), an archaeological site on the same farmstead

References

Houses on the National Register of Historic Places in Illinois
Barns on the National Register of Historic Places in Illinois
Houses completed in 1861
Houses in Jersey County, Illinois
1861 establishments in Illinois
National Register of Historic Places in Jersey County, Illinois